One justice of the North Carolina Supreme Court and three judges of the North Carolina Court of Appeals were elected by North Carolina voters on November 6, 2012, concurrently with the elections for Governor and other offices. North Carolina judicial elections are non-partisan. Terms for seats on each court are eight years. In three of the four races, incumbents were re-elected to their seats, but incumbent Court of Appeals Judge Cressie Thigpen (who had never been elected but rather was appointed to fill a vacancy on the court) was defeated by Chris Dillon.

Supreme Court
Associate Justice Paul Martin Newby ran for re-election. N.C. Court of Appeals Judge Sam J. Ervin IV challenged Newby in the general election.

Polling

Results
Newby won his second eight-year term on the North Carolina Supreme Court by taking 51.9 percent of the vote and defeating Ervin. 

Justice at Stake estimated that total spending by Newby, Ervin, and outside groups in this contest surpassed $4.4 million, breaking North Carolina records for spending in judicial elections. One group, Americans for Prosperity, spent $250,000 in support of Newby, more than the group had ever spent on any judicial election.

Court of Appeals (Bryant seat)
Judge Wanda G. Bryant was the incumbent and ran for re-election. She was challenged by District Court Judge Marty McGee. Bryant won re-election with 56.5 percent of the vote.

Court of Appeals (McGee seat)
Judge Linda McGee ran for re-election to a third full term. She was challenged by attorney David S. Robinson. McGee won re-election with 61.2 percent of the vote.

Court of Appeals (Thigpen seat)
Judge Cressie Thigpen, who was appointed to fill the vacancy caused by former Judge Barbara Jackson's election to the Supreme Court, ran for a full term. He was challenged by attorney/bank executive Chris Dillon, who ran for a seat on the Court of Appeals in 2010. Dillon defeated Thigpen and won the seat with 52.8 percent of the vote.

References
State Board of Elections: Lists of Judges and Term Expiration Dates
WRAL/Associated Press: A quick glance at NC appeals courts candidates

External links
Judge Wanda Bryant campaign site
Judge Marty McGee campaign site
Judge Linda McGee campaign site
Judge Cressie Thigpen campaign site
Judge Sam Ervin campaign site
Justice Paul Newby campaign site

Judicial
2012